Chuck Steel: Night of the Trampires is a 2018 British stop-motion animated action comedy horror film written and directed by Mike Mort, who also stars the titular lead role. The film follows Chuck Steel, a no-nonsense maverick renegade cop who is pitted against a horde of vampire-like beings who feast upon the blood of those who are drunk. The film parodies and pays homage to live action films of the 1980s. It had its premiere at the Annecy International Animation Film Festival in France on 12 June 2018.

Plot
The film opens with a man and a woman walking home from a night out in L.A., the man, who is very intoxicated, stumbled into a large, hairy homeless man, who turns out to be some kind of monster, who then violently bites him on the neck. The woman is then confronted by another similarly monstrous homeless person, and is also bitten, but manages to run away, but is then hit by a speeding police car.

Afterwards, a flashback/dream sequence then proceeds from the perspective of renegade, maverick, cop-on-the-edge Chuck Steel, of the supposed circumstance of how he lost his wife, by being kidnapped by the local Yakuza, and falling from a helicopter to her death. Chuck then wakes up just before he crashes into a billboard advertising a circus. He then gets ready for his day, and sees on the TV a report about the new Governor and how he plans to reduce alcohol consumption in the city and help the local homeless population. He then shoots his TV and leaves his apartment to go to work. He's met by his new partner, a rookie cop named Barney, and Steel proceeds to take down some gangsters in a way that causes massive collateral damage whilst ranting to Barney about how he hates working with partners, and works alone.
Steel is then brought before his captain, Jack Schitt, who berates Steel for his excessive methods, and reveals that Barney was so traumatised by the experience that he shot himself. The captain says that he's determined to get Steel partnered up with somebody, and gives him a choice between a Swedish woman, a monkey, or a cheese plant. He chooses the woman, but is shocked to find that she is a gormless, huge, very-clumsy masculine woman.

The pair then go to the hospital to interview the woman from the opening, but find an old British man standing over her about to stake her. They arrest him and during the interrogation, he reveals that he is supernatural hunter Professor Van Rental, and that he was trying to stake the woman because she was about to become a Trampire. 
Van Rental explains that back when vampires ruled over Transylvania, they were eventually driven out by the locals and forced into squalor, scrounging for food and living like derelicts. After eons of this, they became depressed and took to binge drinking, and this devolved them to the point where their thirst for blood and alcohol became one and the same, and now will only pray on those with high blood alcohol levels. Steel doesn't believe him and has him thrown in jail. His captain then tells him that he's due an appointment with the department psychiatrist, Dr. Allex Cular for his anger management, but is reluctant to do so, but eventually does so.
During the session Steel acts stand-offish and refuses to talk about his wife, but also is concerned by how Cular has been turning the rest of the station into barely stable, ineffective messes.

Through a montage, the Trampires continue to attack and create more of their numbers over the next few days, during which, Van Rental manages to escape prison and returns to the hospital to stake the woman from before, but Steel arrives just before he can, but is now more believing about what's going on. He opens the drapes and kills the Trampire with sunlight, but not before threatening that the 'Master' will make them pay, after which, she then turns into a bat and bites Chuck on the nose. During the struggle, they manage to defeat the bat, but in the process, Chuck's partner falls out the window to her death.
Back and the station, Steel and Van Rental try to explain what happened to the captain, including how since Chuck was bitten, he'll become a Trampire too by midnight. The captain doesn't believe them, thinking it's another one of Chucks conspiracy theories like how the governor is an Illuminati lizard man, but allows Steel till midnight to sort this mess out, but takes the monkey, Bubbles, along with him as a partner.

Van Rental and Steel then proceed to get drunk as a way to lure out the Trampires, during which Van Rental explains that the Master is a Trampire who is destined to bring about 'The Lock-In' where the sun will be blocked out and everyone on Earth will then drink constantly, creating an endless food supply for the Trampires, but, a chosen one is also destined to defeat them. After several failed attempts to find Trampires, they dress Chuck up as a woman, since couples are more likely to be attacked, and find one, who they then follow back to their lair, to find that their Master is in fact Cular.
Her plan was to make the L.A.P.D ineffective so that they would have no problem finding the 'Puritan' a figure who they must kill to bring about the Lock-In, who Steel and Van Rental correctly predict to be the Governor.

Van Rental and Steel are captured by Cular where it's revealed that Chuck's wife did not die, but left him for a clown, and he kept it a secret to protect his image. The pair are then tied up while Cular and her Trampires go to the circus, where the governor would be, to execute their plan. Bubbles helps the two escape, but in the process is killed by a Trampire pig, who then carries off Van Rental. Steel returns to his apartment to arm himself for the final showdown, but finds his landlord Gussman and pet parrot are Trampires too, and they accidentally set of Chuck's apartment's self-destruct, and Chuck and his weapons are blown onto the street. He then wakes up in a homeless town, where it's revealed that the non-Trampire homeless of L.A. know about the monsters and, due to a crude drawing discovered by a man called 'The Wise One' believe that Chuck is the chosen one to defeat the Master.

Chuck then goes to the circus with the homeless, and are joined by Van Rental where the final showdown ensues. A massive battle takes place where most of the Trampires are killed, but Cular then reveals her true form, a gargantuan gargoyle-like creature with tongues for nipples and a giant womb that opens up and ensnares people with a massive tentacle. She manages to grab the Governor, who then reveals that he is in fact an Illuminati Lizard, and fights her. During this, Chuck succumbs to the bite and becomes a Trampire, but by using his ex-wife’s crucifix necklace, he turns himself back into a human, and he and Van Rental manage to defeat the Master through a combination of wooden-tipped bullets, Holy Coffee and shoving the crucifix necklace down her mouth, though her liver survives. As Chuck then proceeds to fight the governor, Van Rental then stakes the Masters liver, and both are eventually destroyed once and for all.
Steel then find his ex-wife, where it is revealed that the break-up letter that she sent him was actually written by the clown she left him for, and the she does still love him, but can't be with him because he's not a clown.

As Chuck and Van Rental exit the circus, Van Rental explains that there are still other creatures out there to fight, to which Chuck then asks him 'Face or Balls?' (in reference to which one he'll punch).

Voice cast 
 Mike Mort as Chuck Steel, Jack Schitt, Van Rental and Maloney
 Jennifer Saunders as Dr. Alex Cular
 Paul Whitehouse as Gussman and Barney
 Dan Russell as Governor, Stretch, Chosen One and Mr. Brownlow
 Jonnie Fiori as Dora
 Samantha Coughlan as Lucy Steel and Mrs. Brownlow

Production 
The film was Mike Mort's feature debut, having only previously made short films. He wrote the first early draft for the film in 2001. For the film, Animortal Studio created 425 puppets in order to represent hundreds of different characters and creatures, and dozens of giant scale-model sets. The stop-motion content was shot at 24 frames per second instead of the standard 12. The budget was purportedly $20 million.

Release and reception 
The film had its premiere at the Annecy International Animation Film Festival in France on 12 June 2018. It was also premiered at Screamfest in  Los Angeles (USA) in October 2018 as well as Fantasia, Montreal (Canada) and at London Frightfest (UK) amongst other film festivals and competitions etc...

On review aggregator Rotten Tomatoes, the film holds an approval rating of  based on  reviews.

The film was nominated for Best Feature Length Film in the Anima't awards category at the Sitges Catalonian International Film Festival. Paul Whitehouse and Jennifer Saunders were nominated for Best Performance in an Animation Film at the UK National Film Awards.

The film won the Guru Audience Award for Best Action Film at Fantasia Festival 2018.

References

External links 
 Official website
 

2018 films
2018 animated films
2018 comedy films
2018 action comedy films
2010s fantasy comedy films
2010s British animated films
Animated comedy films
2010s stop-motion animated films
2010s action horror films
Films set in Wales
2010s English-language films
British adult animated films
2010s British films